Kyichu Lhakhang, (also known as Kyerchu Temple or Lho Kyerchu) is an important Himalayan Buddhist temple situated in Lango Gewog of Paro District in Bhutan.

History
The Jowo Temple of Kyichu is one of the oldest temples in Bhutan, originally  built in the 7th century by the Tibetan Emperor Songtsen Gampo. It is considered to be one of the 108 border taming temples he built. In the 8th century the temple was visited by Padmasambhava and it is believed he concealed many spiritual treasures here. Je Khenpo Sherab Gyaltshen wrote that during the 12th century the temple was looked after by the Lhapa Kagyu tradition and that during the 13th century it was handed over to a descendant of Phajo Drugom Zhigpo's son Nyima. In his The Nyingma School of Tibetan Buddhism: Its Fundamentals and History, Jigdral Yeshe Dorje (2nd Dudjom Rinpoche) records that the Jowo Temple of Kyichu could not be seen and that Pema Lingpa (1450-1521) uncovered the temple and restored it as it was before. In 1644 the temple was taken over by Ngawang Namgyal. From 1836 to 1838 the temple was restored and re-consecrated by the 25th Je Khenpo Sherab Gyaltshen. In 1971, Kesang Choden Wangchuck, the queen of Jigme Dorji Wangchuck built a Guru Temple next to the old Jowo Temple which was consecrated by Dilgo Khyentse. Ever since then the annual rites of great accomplishment for the deities Vajrasattva, Palchen Heruka, and Vajrakilaya have been held in this temple for the well-being of the country under the patronage of Kesang Choden Wangchuck. There is a belief that the two orange trees in the courtyard of Kyichu Lhakhang bear fruit throughout the year.It was built to Subdue Demoness (Sin Mo)

Geomancy 
The temple is part of a network of 12 temples arranged around Jo-khang temple at Lhasa. All of them were built in the time of King Songtsen Gampo.

References

Bibliography
 

 

Buddhist monasteries in Bhutan